Vasil Varlamos (born 17 June 1942) is a former Australian rules footballer who played for Carlton in the Victorian Football League (VFL) during the early 1960s. He is a half back flanker in the Greek Team of the Century.

Varlamos was with Carlton for five seasons and played as 19th man in the 1962 VFL Grand Final, which they lost to Essendon. A stocky half back, he was cleared to Waverley in 1965 and participated in their surprise premiership that year. He represented the VFA at the 1966 Hobart Carnival.

References

Holmesby, Russell and Main, Jim (2007). The Encyclopedia of AFL Footballers. 7th ed. Melbourne: Bas Publishing.

1942 births
Living people
Australian people of Greek descent
Carlton Football Club players
Waverley Football Club players
Australian rules footballers from Victoria (Australia)